Fotbal Club Universitatea Galați, commonly known as Universitatea Galați, or simply U Galați, is a Romanian women's football club based in Galați, Galați County, Romania. The team was founded in 2015 and promoted to Liga I at the end of the 2017–18 season, as the winner of the first series of the Liga II.

Universitatea Galați plays its home matches on Siderurgistul Stadium with a capacity of 6,000 seats.

Honours

Leagues
Liga I
Runners-up (1): 2019–20
Liga II
Winners (1): 2017–18

Season by season

Current squad

Club officials

Board of directors

 Last updated: 19 January 2019
 Source:

Current technical staff

 Last updated: 19 January 2019
 Source:

References

External links
 

Women's football clubs in Romania
Football clubs in Galați County
Sport in Galați
Association football clubs established in 2015
2015 establishments in Romania
University and college association football clubs in Romania